Carlow-Kilkenny FC is an association football club based in Kilkenny, Ireland.

The club joined the Southern Elite Division of the Under-17 National League after being awarded the licence for 2019 season.

References

Football teams
Kilkenny (city)
Ireland